The 2017 Europe's Strongest Man was a strongman competition that took place in Leeds, England on 1 April 2017 at the First Direct Arena. This event was part of the 2017 Giants live tour.

Results of events

Event 1: Bus Pull
Weight: 
Course Length:

Event 2: Max Axle Press
 

^ Adam Bishop sustained an injury in this event and took no further part in the competition.

Event 3: Flip and Drag
Weight: 4 x  tyre flips, 1 x anchor drag 
Course Length:

Event 4: Deadlift
Weight:  for as many repetitions as possible.
Time Limit: 60 seconds 

^ Dainis Zageris sustained an injury in this event and took no further part in the competition.

^ Laurence Shahlaei sustained an injury in this event and took no further part in the competition.

Event 5: Car Walk
Weight: 
Course Length:

Event 6: Atlas Stones

Final Results

References

External links 

Competitions in the United Kingdom
Europe's Strongest Man